Margaret Buckner Young (March 29, 1921 – December 5, 2009) was an American educator and author.

Biography 
The daughter of Eva Carter and Frank Buckner, she was born Margaret Buckner in Campbellsville, Kentucky and was educated in Aurora, Illinois and at Kentucky State Industrial College, receiving a bachelor's degree in English and French. In 1944, she married Whitney M. Young, Jr. Young continued her education, receiving a master's degree in educational psychology from the University of Minnesota. In 1953, the couple moved to Atlanta where she taught educational psychology at Spelman College. In 1961, they moved to New Rochelle, New York, where she mainly concentrated on raising their two daughters; she also began her writing career.

After her husband's death in 1971, Young became involved in promoting racial equality and in improving relations between the United States and other countries including Nigeria, Yugoslavia and China. She also devoted herself to preserving her husband's legacy through the Whitney M. Young, Jr. Memorial Foundation, the National Urban League and other institutions. In 1973, she was a member of the United States delegation to the United Nations General Assembly.

Young moved to Denver, Colorado in 1990. She died there at the age of 88 from complications related to cancer.
She has two daughters, Marcia Young Cantarella, PhD has been a dean or senior administrator at several colleges including NYU, Princeton and Hunter Colleges, serves 
on several boards and is the author of I CAN Finish College: The Overcome Any Obstacle and Get Your Degree Guide.
Her daughter Lauren Young Casteel became the first black woman to head a foundation in Colorado.
There are also several grandchildren and great grandchildren, including businessman Mark Boles who served on the Urban League board and artist Jordan Casteel.

Selected works
 How to Bring Up Your Child Without Prejudice (1965)
 The First Book of American Negroes (1966)
 The Picture Life of Martin Luther King, Jr. (1968)
 Black American Leaders (1969)
 The Picture Life of Thurgood Marshall (1971)

References

External links
 
Finding aid to the Margaret Buckner Young papers at Columbia University Rare Book & Manuscript Library

1921 births
2009 deaths
20th-century American writers
20th-century American women writers
Spelman College faculty
Kentucky State University alumni
University of Minnesota College of Education and Human Development alumni
Educators from Kentucky
Kentucky women in education
African-American educators
Writers from Kentucky
American children's writers
African-American women writers
African-American writers
People from Campbellsville, Kentucky
Deaths from cancer in Colorado
Kentucky women writers